Arshad Sauleh (Urdu: ارشر صالح) is an artist and a radio broadcaster born in a Muslim family at Srinagar in the summer capital of Kashmir who has remained host/judge of several noted art exhibitions   besides he is teaching art at Government College of Education in Srinagar.

Contribution and awards 

Arshid Sauleh represented India in the 2002 International Exhibition of Quranic paintings in Iran. He was honored by Ministry of Heritage and Islamic Guidance, Government of Iran to the  tenth International Exhibition on Quranic Paintings. During Kashmir conflict 

2011-Merit Award by State Academy of Art Culture and Language Srinagar.

See also
 M F Husain

References 

Indian male painters
Living people
People from Srinagar
1971 births
Indian portrait painters
Painters from Jammu and Kashmir